The 34th Goya Awards ceremony, presented by the Academy of Cinematographic Arts and Sciences (AACCE), honored the best in Spanish films of 2019 and took place at the Palacio de Deportes José María Martín Carpena in Málaga on 25 January 2020. The ceremony was televised in Spain by Televisión Española (TVE) and was hosted for the second consecutive year by television presenter and comedian Andreu Buenafuente and actress Silvia Abril. It was also televised for the international public by the TVE Internacional channel. It was the third overall time and the second consecutive year that the ceremony was held outside of Madrid: previously the 14th edition and the 33rd edition had taken place in Barcelona and Seville respectively. It was also the second consecutive year that the ceremony takes place in Andalusia. 

Nominations were announced on 2 December 2019 by Elena Anaya and Miguel Herrán. While at War received the most nominations with seventeen, followed by Pain and Glory and The Endless Trench with sixteen and fifteen nominations respectively.

Pain and Glory won seven awards including Best Film, Best Director for Pedro Almodóvar, Best Actor for Antonio Banderas, Best Supporting Actress for Julieta Serrano, and Best Original Screenplay.

Winners and nominees 
The nominees and winners are listed as follows:

Major awards

Other award nominees

Honorary Goya
 Pepa Flores "Marisol"

Performances
The following artists performed musical performances.

References

External links
Official site

34
2019 film awards
2019 in Spanish cinema
2020s in Andalusia
January 2020 events in Spain